Braishfield is a village and civil parish  north of Romsey in Hampshire, England. The name is thought to be derived from the Old English bræsc + feld, meaning 'open land with small branches or brushwood'. The hamlet of Pucknall lies due east of the village.

Geology
The parish lies on the northern edge of the Hampshire Basin, with chalk in the north. To the south and east of the village this is overlain by Palaeocene sands and clays of the Lambeth Group. At the southern edge the Sir Harold Hillier Gardens are on younger deposits of Eocene age, sloping from a ridge of the Nursling sands into a valley of London Clay.

History
Archaeological  discoveries in Braishfield include the remains of some of the oldest dwellings to be found in Great Britain and the first Neolithic dwelling site of any kind to be discovered in Hampshire.

Higgins James Bown of Laurel Cottage, was the village wheelwright, carpenter, chairmaker and undertaker. H.J. Bown died in July 1954 aged 88 years. His woodworking tools were donated to the Museum of English Rural Life.

Places of interest
The Church of England parish church of All Saints was built in 1855 to a design by William Butterfield.

Transport
The Village has neither main roads nor railways, but is crossed by the Monarch's Way long-distance footpath.

Sport
Braishfield has a long running football club, who play their home games at the Recreation Ground. Founded in 1907, Braishfield football club  run two adult sides in the Southampton League, a 1st team  and a reserve  team. They also have six boys teams at various age groups in the Test Way Youth League known as the Braishfield bees. There is also a village cricket club.

Local folklore and legend
Braishfield is reputedly haunted.

Media appearances
Much of the 1979-1981 television series Worzel Gummidge was filmed in and around Braishfield.

Twin towns
Braishfield is twinned with:

 Crouay, France

References

Villages in Hampshire
Test Valley
Reportedly haunted locations in South East England